Westholme School is a coeducational private school in Blackburn, Lancashire, England.

Founded in 1923, it caters for boys and girls aged from 3 years to 18 years. The school became fully coeducational in 2018.

Westholme's motto is ‘MENS SANA IN CORPORE SANO' meaning ‘A healthy mind in a healthy body'.

Dr Richard Robson is the current principal of the school.

History 
Westholme School was founded in Blackburn by Miss Emily Singleton on 19 April 1923. A qualified teacher originally from Blackburn, Miss Singleton decided to form a small primary school during the Great Depression due to the lack of alternatives in the local area. She started off by providing space and education for small numbers of local children in her parents' house, called Westholme on Preston New Road in Blackburn.

By 1948 the school had gained in popularity, having grown to around 135 pupils and being officially recognised by the government as a formal place of education. This growth led to the formation of a secondary school and a move to larger premises in the area. During this time Westholme was beginning to gain a reputation for first rate education and pupil numbers continued to increase over the years. By now Miss Singleton was nearing retirement age and she needed a new buyer who could continue her work at the school. She came to an agreement with former WW1 veteran Mr Arthur Rouse, who became the new school principal and joined the school from the University of Salford.

In 1968 the school became a charity administered by a board of governors and a sixth form was established with a ten-acre site building programme that included an assembly hall, laboratories, swimming pool, sports hall, playing fields, music centre and art studios. This meant that in just over 40 years the school had grown dramatically from its small beginnings as a source of primary education for a few local children at Miss Singleton's parents' house. It now consisted of a primary school, secondary school and sixth form all based at different locations just down the road from each other.  

Over the next few decades Westholme continued to develop and became one of the most successful schools in Lancashire, providing pupils with high-quality independent education and leisure opportunities. The school's expansion carried on during the late 1990s with the arrival of the then new school principal Lillian Croston. New facilities and extensions were built onto the existing school buildings, with each location being extensively modernised and equipped with contemporary teaching technology.

For 25 years, Mrs Croston developed and steered the school through many new directions before retiring in 2013. Mrs Lynne Horner became the new principal of the school in September 2013 and Westholme continued to enjoy sustained progress under her stewardship. In January 2021 Dr Richard Robson became the new principal as it moves towards it centenary year.

Present day 
Westholme became fully coeducational from September 2018 and currently accepts boys and girls between the ages of 3 years to 18 years. At present over 700 girls and boys attend the school every day, travelling from the areas throughout Lancashire.

The school is independently run, and as such, charges tuition fees. However, tuition fees charged by Westholme are amongst the lowest in the country due to their ethos of making education as financially available as possible. Scholarships are available to reward excellence and potential in a variety of areas. Scholarship entry into Year 3, Year 7 and Year 12 and are at the principal's discretion. Bursaries can be applied for prior to entry into Year 7 and Year 12, and in line with the school's charitable status are means tested. The value of the Bursary is related to the financial resources of the student's family and the School's available funds.

There is an upcoming next phase of development for the school, with plans to move the Infant & Junior Schools from their current locations of Billinge House and Beardwood Bank to the Senior School and Sixth Form campus situated at Wilmar Lodge.

Academic 
The school aims to provide a curriculum which offers a balanced course, including the skills of numeracy, literacy, communication and the study of the physical, social and aesthetic environment. Positive attitudes towards study are encouraged and extensive careers and university advice is given to Sixth Form students with the aim of them achieving a place at university upon leaving the school. Class sizes are small, with high-quality teaching and facilities on offer. The vast majority of Westholme students go on to further education and a large proportion obtain places at their first choice university, whether in the UK or abroad. The school boasts a good relationship with many Russell Group universities. Emphasis is placed upon giving students individual pastoral care, self-development and fostering life skills that build character in order for them to achieve success in their future careers.

Ethos 
Westholme School has a Protestant Christian foundation but all its benefits...shall be open to pupils of any creed. (Articles of Association of Westholme School 1968).

‘It is the ethos of Westholme School that all pupils of all ages should be valued for their achievements and positive qualities. Throughout the community of Westholme there is respect for all religious and moral values and tolerance of other races, religions and ways of life. All people who make up the Westholme community should receive equality of opportunity with their peers. While knowledge of and respect for different cultures will always be encouraged, Westholme considers that no one should seek to impose his or her beliefs and practices upon others.'

Pastoral care is also an important aspect of the school ethos. Westholme believe that by creating a family atmosphere where pupils are safe and secure, they can help children to achieve more in their lessons and wider activities.

Sports and extra-curricular activities 
The primary sports offered at the school are football, rugby, cricket, hockey, netball, cross-country and swimming. As well as on site sporting facilities, the school makes use of local amenities such as the athletics track at Witton Park, various running courses in Billinge Wood and the adjacent countryside and the cricket facilities at Cherry Tree Cricket Club.

Facilities include:

Indoor

 Sports Hall including cricket nets
 20m swimming pool and baby pool
 Fitness suite
 Dance studio

Outdoor

 Full size synthetic hockey pitch
 Football pitches
 Rugby pitch
 Tennis/netball hard courts
 Grass athletics track
 Onsite cross-country course

Westholme also promote inter-house competition where students compete against each other throughout the year at events such as Sports' Days, swimming galas, music and reading competitions. Music and drama programs are also offered, with teaching and productions taking place in multi-purpose facilities on the school campus. Theatrical productions take place every year at the school and often involve the cooperation of the school orchestra, with examples being Beauty & the Beast, Miss Saigon and the Phantom of the Opera. For the last 20 years, members of the school choir have undertaken a performing tour during the summer holidays across locations such as Salzburg, New York, Monte Carlo and Paris.  

Westholme are partnered with several sports clubs and organisations local to the area. These include partnerships with Accrington Stanley FC, Blackburn Rovers FC, Preston Grasshoppers RFC, Blackburn Rugby Club and Blackburn Cathedral - where the schools carol services are held annually.

Notable former pupils 

Professor Sophie Scott - Neuroscientist and deputy director of UCL's Institute of Cognitive Neuroscience
Seema Kennedy - Former Westholme Head Girl and former Conservative MP for South Ribble
Diana Vickers - Singer-songwriter and stage actress
 Helen Flanagan - Actress
 Jessica Cunningham - The Apprentice winner 2016
 Charlotte OC - Singer–songwriter

References

External links 
 Official website

Private schools in Blackburn with Darwen
Diamond schools